Afroguppya is a genus of gastropods belonging to the family Euconulidae.

The species of this genus are found in Africa.

Species:

Afroguppya rumrutiensis 
Afroguppya solemi

References

Euconulidae